The Montreal–Gaspé train (formerly the Chaleur) was a thrice-weekly passenger train operated by Via Rail between Montreal and Gaspé, Quebec.

Service east of Matapédia, Quebec, was suspended by Via Rail in August 2013, owing to poor track conditions between Matapédia and Gaspé. Replacement buses between these two points operated until 17 September 2013, after which the bus service was withdrawn.

History

In 1907 the Quebec Atlantic Oriental Railway was built from Matapédia through New Carlisle to Port Daniel, and gradually extended until it reached Gaspé. Before that, inhabitants had to drive by horse or sleigh  to catch the Intercolonial Railway from Matapédia to Montreal, a journey of four days.

Schedule 
The train left Montreal in the evening and arrived in Gaspé at about noon the following day.  The train departed Gaspé mid-afternoon and arrived in Montreal in the morning.

Operation 
In later years the train was normally merged with the Ocean between Montreal and Matapédia.  The Montreal–Gaspé train after 1995 was composed exclusively of cars built by the Budd Company, many originally used by the Canadian Pacific Railway's Canadian.

This had been the case until 2004 for the Ocean as well, but the introduction of the Renaissance cars on the Ocean resulted in both trains operating separately during the summer months (when trains were longer) and combined during the winter; the reason for this policy appears to be related to the braking effort of a combined train.

When operating separately, the Montreal–Gaspé train would run several minutes ahead of the Ocean.  When combined, the trains ran together as far as Matapédia, before the Ocean continued to Halifax, Nova Scotia and the Montreal–Gaspé train proceeded to Gaspé.

Suspension of service east of Matapédia

On 22 August 2013, Via Rail announced that as a result of Société de chemin de fer de la Gaspésie (SCFG)'s rail infrastructure problems (including rail corrosion and malfunctioning crossing signals),  service between Matapédia and Gaspé would be suspended. Service resumed about a month later as buses were used to transport passengers until the track upgrades were completed. As of 17 September 2013, both rail and bus service in the affected portion were suspended, and no timeline for re-establishment was released.

In 2020, the repair was finally underway and the rail section from Matapédia to Port Daniel is expected to be operational in late 2023. Via Rail said, however, they wish to wait until the whole line is repaired before resuming service.

Route 

The tracks this train operated on have changed ownership several times. Until 1998, the tracks from Montreal to Gaspé were owned by Canadian National Railway (CN).  That year, CN sold the lines between Rivière-du-Loup and Matapédia, as well as Matapédia to Gaspé, to Quebec Railway Corporation which established two subsidiary companies, the Chemin de fer de la Matapédia et du Golfe (Matapédia & Gulf Railway) and Chemin de fer Baie des Chaleurs (Chaleur Bay Railway) respectively.  In 2001, CFBC sold the portion of the Matapédia-to-Gaspé line east of Chandler to Chemin de fer de la Gaspésie (Gaspé Railway), which is owned by local municipalities with maintenance contracted to CFBC.  In 2007, CFG purchased the remainder of the line from Matapédia to Chandler after the CFBC listed it for abandonment.  In 2008, CN purchased the CFMG line from Rivière-du-Loup to Matapédia, returning ownership of this line after QRC encountered financial difficulty.

References 

"By Rail to the Gaspé, Via The Chaleur; A Return Trip in 2005", by John C. Dahl, Empire State Express, 2005.  Published by Hamburg:  Niagara Frontier Chapter, NRHS

External links

Gaspé Peninsula
Former Via Rail routes
Passenger rail transport in Quebec
Night trains of Canada
Rail transport in Gaspésie–Îles-de-la-Madeleine